Yang Liu

Violinist Yang Liu is enjoying his life in music making on stages across the continents. He tours in North America, South America and Asia with world leading orchestras, Mr. Liu also travels with his wife Olivia in concert tours across the United States and Asia, sharing their love, joy and faith through music. An avid advocate of cultural exchange via classical music, he is a founder of Yang and Olivia Foundation and Momento Virtuosi, a chamber ensemble of diverse ethnicity and instrumentation.

Yang Liu is the winner of China's 5th National Violin Competition and a prize winner of the Twelfth International Tchaikovsky Competition in Moscow.

Making his North American debut in 2002 with the Atlanta Symphony orchestra performing Paganini's First Violin Concerto. This success was followed by touring engagements with the St. Louis Symphony Orchestra conducted by Robert Spano; Cincinnati Symphony Orchestra; Cincinnati Chamber Orchestra; the Odense Symphony Orchestra, Denmark, São Paulo Symphony,  Brazil. He also completes a 5-city tour in China performing the Butterfly Concerto with Qingdao Symphony Orchestra, as part of the China-US cultural exchange initiated by Secretary of State of the US John Kerry, and chairman of the cultural department of China Mr. Luo .

Yang Liu was honored to be featured in a documentary called “String of heart--Yang Liu” highlighting Yang's artistic life. This production was aired on CCTV (China Central Television) throughout China, together with his autobiographical book "Performing in Love"  which is published in the spring of 2014. In 2017, Mr. Liu performed on China's most prestigious special New Year TV program in Qingdao, reaches tens of million viewers. Yang was also a featured performer in Starling's Emmy Award-winning educational video, Classical Quest. His debut recording, “Song of Nostalgia,” was released to critical acclaim. This recording, along with many of his live performances, is frequently heard on National Public Radio in USA.

Mr. Liu resides in Chicago with his wife Olivia and two happy boys, he frequently performs and teaches in the Great Wall Music Academy led by his former teacher Kurt Sassmannshaus, Aspen music festival, the Ravinia festival, the Chicago classical music radio WFMT, SESC international music festival of Brazil and gives master classes in major universities and music conservatories.

Yang Liu studied with Lin, Yaoji in Beijing, China, then moved to US in 1998 to study with Kurt Sassmannshaus and Dorothy Delay.

Mr. Liu plays a Guarneri made in 1741 on a generous loan from Stradivary Society and the Bein & Fushi Rare violins.

References

External links
 

Living people
People's Republic of China musicians
Musicians from Qingdao
Roosevelt University faculty
Educators from Shandong
Chinese classical violinists
21st-century classical violinists
Year of birth missing (living people)